In probability theory and statistics, a cross-covariance matrix is a matrix whose element in the i, j position is the covariance between the i-th element of a random vector and j-th element of another random vector. A random vector is a random variable with multiple dimensions. Each element of the vector is a scalar random variable. Each element has either a finite number of observed empirical values or a finite or infinite number of potential values. The potential values are specified by a theoretical joint probability distribution. Intuitively, the cross-covariance matrix generalizes the notion of covariance to multiple dimensions.

Definition

The vectors  and  need not have the same dimension, and either might be a scalar value.

The cross-covariance matrix is the matrix whose  entry is the covariance

This gives the following component-wise definition of the cross-covariance matrix.

Example

Properties
For the cross-covariance matrix, the following basic properties apply:

 
 
 
 

Definition for complex random vectors

Transposition is replaced by Hermitian transposition:

For complex random vectors, another matrix called the pseudo-cross-covariance matrix is defined as follows:

Uncorrelatedness

References

Covariance and correlation
Matrices